Caladenia leptochila subsp. dentata, commonly known as the toothed spider orchid, narrow-lipped spider-orchid or narrow-lipped caladenia, is a plant in the orchid family Orchidaceae and is endemic to South Australia. It has a single leaf and one or two mostly reddish-brown flowers. It differs from subspecies leptochila in the colour of its flowers, toothed edges to its labellum, and its distribution.

Description
Caladenia leptochila subsp. dentata is a terrestrial, perennial, deciduous, herb with an underground tuber and which usually occurs as single plants or in small groups. The lateral sepals are a similar size to the dorsal sepal and turn stiffly upwards. There are many short teeth along the sides of the labellum and four rows of calli along its centre on the flatter part. Flowering occurs from October to November.

Taxonomy and naming
The toothed spider orchid was first formally described by David Jones in 2006 and given the name Arachnorchis leptochila subsp. dentata. The description was published in Australian Orchid Research from a specimen collected in Alligator Gorge. In 2008 Robert Bates changed the name to Caladenia leptochila subsp. dentata and the change was published in the Journal of the Adelaide Botanic Garden. The epithet (dentata) is a Latin word meaning “toothed” or "pointed" referring to the teeth on the edges of the labellum.

Distribution and habitat

References

leptochila subsp. dentata
Endemic orchids of Australia
Orchids of South Australia
Plants described in 2006
Taxa named by David L. Jones (botanist)
Taxa named by Robert John Bates